El bueno para nada ("The Good for Nothing") is a 1973 Mexican comedy film directed by Gilberto Martínez Solares and produced by Miguel Zacarías. It is the fourteenth film starring Gaspar Henaine alone as Capulina (without Marco Antonio Campos as Viruta). Lina Marín, Susana Alexander, and Pancho Córdova are also featured.

Cast
Gaspar Henaine as Capulina Mantecón: an incompetent handyman.
Lina Marín as María: Capulina's girlfriend and the Saldañas' housemaid.
Susana Alexander as Carolina Saldaña: Benigno's wife and María's employer.
Pancho Córdova as Benigno Saldaña: Carolina's husband and María's employer.
Ivonne Govea as the wife of the jealous husband.
Juan Gallardo as the police inspector of the Procuraduría General de la República.
Enrique Pontón as Otto I: Inventor of a machine capable of causing earthquakes.

Production
Principal photography for El bueno para nada commenced in April 1970. Filming locations included Estudios Churubusco, Mexico City, and Acapulco, Guerrero.

Release
El bueno para nada premiered on July 26, 1973 (nearly three years after its production) in a total of fourteen Mexico City cinemas for five weeks.

References

External links

1973 comedy films
1973 films
Mexican comedy films
1970s Spanish-language films
1970s Mexican films